The Namhae Expressway Branch 3, or the Namhae Expressway 3rd Branch is an expressway in South Korea, connecting Changwon to Gimhae. It is branch line of Namhae Expressway.

Constructions

Lanes 
 4 lanes

Length 
 15.26 km

Limited Speed 
 50-100 km/h

References

Expressways in South Korea
Roads in South Gyeongsang